HD 5608 is an orange-hued star in the northern constellation of Andromeda with one known planet, HD 5608 b. It is a dim star near the lower limit of visibility to the naked eye, having an apparent visual magnitude of +5.98. It is moving closer to the Earth with a heliocentric radial velocity of −23 km/s, and is expected to make its closest approach in 1.285 million years when it comes to within .

This is a K-type subgiant star on the red giant branch track with a stellar classification of K0 IV. It has 1.5 times the mass of the Sun and, at the age of three billion years, has expanded to five times the Sun's radius. It is radiating 13 times the Sun's luminosity from its enlarged photosphere at an effective temperature of 4,897 K. It has a higher than solar metallicity – a term astronomers use to describe the abundance of elements other than hydrogen and helium.

Planetary companion
In 2012, the Okayama Planet Search Program reported the detection of a substellar companion in orbit around HD 5608, based upon Doppler measurements between 2003 and 2011 from the Okayama observatory in Kurashiki. These showed a linear trend indicating the existence of a distant companion. The data showed an additional periodicity of around 766 days. The high eccentricity of this planet could have been induced by the low mass companion star HD 5608B via the Kozai mechanism.

References

K-type subgiants
Planetary systems with one confirmed planet
Binary stars
Andromeda (constellation)
Durchmusterung objects
005608
004552
0275